Dame Juliet Louise Wheldon DCB, QC (26 March 1950 – 2 September 2013) was a British civil servant, latterly (as of 2009) the legal adviser to Mervyn King, the Governor of the Bank of England. From July 2000 until 2006 she was the first British woman to serve as Treasury Solicitor and Head of the Government Legal Service. In 2008 she was named as one of The Times Law 100.

Education
Wheldon attended Sherborne School For Girls and Lady Margaret Hall, Oxford, where she read history,  before being called to the Bar by Gray's Inn in 1975.

Career

 Department of the Treasury Solicitor (1976–83), Advisory Division
 Law Officers' Department (1983–84)
 Department of the Treasury Solicitor (1984–86), Assistant Legal Secretary
 Law Officers' Department (1986–87)
 Department of the Treasury Solicitor (1987–89), Legal Adviser
 Law Officers' Department (1989–97), Legal Secretary
 Home Office (1997–2000), Legal Adviser
 HM Procurator General Office, Treasury Solicitor/Head of the Government Legal Service (2000–06)

Affiliations
 Patron, Human Rights Lawyers' Association

Honours
 Commander of the Order of the Bath (2004)
 Queen's Counsel (Hon.) (1997)
 Dame Commander of the Order of the Bath (2004)

Personal life
Dame Juliet Wheldon was unmarried and had no children. She died of cancer on 2 September 2013.

References

External links
 Bank of England website
 Debrett's
 The Guardian, Saturday, 5 November 2005
 London Gazette notice of Juliet Wheldon appointment as DCB

1950 births
2013 deaths
Alumni of Lady Margaret Hall, Oxford
Fellows of Lady Margaret Hall, Oxford
Members of Gray's Inn
Treasury Solicitors
Civil servants in the Attorney General's Office (United Kingdom)
Civil servants in the Home Office
Dames Commander of the Order of the Bath
Lawyers from London
20th-century King's Counsel
21st-century King's Counsel
Place of birth missing
People educated at Sherborne Girls
British women lawyers
20th-century women lawyers
20th-century English lawyers